Bristolian may refer to:

 A native of the City of Bristol, England
 The Bristolian (train), a named passenger train of the Great Western Railway
 The Bristolian (newsletter), a left-leaning newssheet published in the early 2000s often critical of Bristol City Council
 Old Bristolian, a former pupil of Bristol Grammar School
 The dialect of Bristol, England
 The sailing yacht Bristolian, a Philippe Briand-designed superyacht built by Yachting Developments Limited (New Zealand) and launched in 2008.
 A proud follower of Bristol Bears from any part of the World